Janet Munro (born Janet Neilson Horsburgh; 28 September 1934 – 6 December 1972) was a British actress. She won a Golden Globe Award for her performance in the film Darby O'Gill and the Little People (1959) and received a BAFTA Film Award nomination for her performance in the film Life for Ruth (1962).

Munro starred in three Disney films: Darby O'Gill and the Little People (1959), Third Man on the Mountain (1959) and Swiss Family Robinson (1960). Other film credits were roles in The Trollenberg Terror (1958) and The Day the Earth Caught Fire (1961).

Biography

Early life
Born Janet Neilson Horsburgh in Blackpool, Lancashire in 1934, she was the daughter of Scottish comedian Alex Munro (real name Alexander Neilson Horsburgh) and his wife, Phyllis Robertshaw. She used her father's stage name professionally.

Munro grew up on the road with her father, often appearing with him on stage. Her mother died when Janet was seven and she was brought up by her father at first. She later recalled "during the war he was head of entertainment for the RAF and I went along with him wherever he happened to be. We entertained the troops. I wore kilts and sang. My voice was even smaller than I was but the boys didn't seem to mind – I was a bit of baggage from home."

She moved to the village of Embsay at age ten to live with her aunt and uncle for a time. When her father remarried she was brought up by him and her stepmother. After leaving school she worked in a shoe shop but her goal was to become an actress. "I never had any doubt as to what I wanted to be", she said later.

Early appearances
Munro's father wanted her to join him on his act but she desired to become a legitimate actress. She got a job at a repertory company as a student messenger and "learned as I went along, playing bits, and by the time I was 17 I was stage manager for the company." She worked in towns like Preston, Oldham and Hull and her wage at the time was around £8 a week.

Munro appeared in a BBC TV adaptation of I Capture the Castle (1954), playing the lead part of Rose.

She had a small part in the Gordon Harker comedy Small Hotel (1957) and started appearing regularly on British TV shows such as ITV Television Playhouse ("One of Us", "Pickup Girl", "Lace on Her Petticoat") and Armchair Theatre ("Trial by Candlelight", "The Deaf Heart").

Munro could be seen in ingenue parts in the feature films The Trollenberg Terror (1958), a horror film, and The Young and the Guilty (1958), a melodrama written by Ted Willis. She appeared on stage in Daughters of Desire and was chosen "Miss English Television of 1958".

Disney
Munro's big break came in March 1958 when cast as the female lead in Disney's Darby O'Gill and the Little People (1959). Although the film was shot in Hollywood it was cast out of London. Disney saw her in "Pick Up Girl" and she was screen tested over a two-day period. Disney liked her so much he signed her to a five-year contract.

Disney immediately used her again as the female lead in Third Man on the Mountain (1959) opposite James MacArthur. Contemporary reports compared her with June Allyson.

Munro made her US television debut when she played the romantic lead in a TV adaptation of Berkeley Square (1959) for Hallmark Hall of Fame. She was directed by George Schaefer and appeared opposite John Kerr. One review said she did "beautiful work."

Munro returned to England to play Tommy Steele's love interest in Tommy the Toreador (1959), then made a third film for Disney, Swiss Family Robinson (1960), again romancing MacArthur. It was shot in the West Indies over five months.

Munro was going to be in Bon Voyage for Disney with Karl Malden but it was not made for another few years, with Deborah Walley in the role announced for Munro. Instead she appeared in The Horsemasters (1961) for him, shot in England for American television, and released theatrically in some markets.

Munro returned to US television with Time Remembered (1961) for Hallmark Hall of Fame.

British films
Munro was the female lead in the science fiction film The Day the Earth Caught Fire (1961), one of her best remembered parts.

She had the female lead role in Life for Ruth (1962), directed by Basil Dearden, which earned her a BAFTA nomination for Best Female Actor.

She returned to Armchair Theatre ("Girl in a Bird Cage", "Afternoon of a Nymph" with Ian Hendry whom she was to marry) and was top billed in a film for the first time with Bitter Harvest (1963), but it was not a success.

Munro was the female lead in Hide and Seek (1964) with Ian Carmichael and A Jolly Bad Fellow (1964) with Leo McKern, one of her alumni from The Day the Earth Caught Fire. She had a cameo in Daylight Robbery (1964).

Return to acting
Munro was inactive in her profession for a few years in order to concentrate on raising a family but returned to acting after her second marriage to Ian Hendry ended in 1968.

She appeared in episodes of Vendetta ("The Running Man"), and Thirty-Minute Theatre ("Turn Off If You Know the Ending") and had a support part in Sebastian (1968).

Munro travelled to New York to star in a TV adaptation of The Admirable Crichton (1968). She had a cameo in Cry Wolf (1969).

Munro was in ITV Playhouse ("Premiere: Flower Dew"), and Cry Wolf (1969). She had the lead in a series, The Tenant of Wildfell Hall (1969). Reviewing the latter The Guardian called her "a revelation. She is no longer the B picture girl next door. She is a woman and her acting has power and experience of life."

Her last roles were in Play for Today ("The Piano"), and in several episodes of the TV series Adam Smith.

In July 1971 she appeared on stage in Look – No Hands.

Personal life
Munro was married to actor Tony Wright from 1956 until 1959. She married Ian Hendry in 1963; the couple had two children, Sally and Corrie. They lived in a house on Pharaoh's Island.

Val Guest, who directed Munro in The Day the Earth Caught Fire, later said "Janet's life was a disaster... [she] didn't become an alcoholic until she met Ian. She tried too hard to keep up with him."

Munro and Hendry were divorced in December 1971. Hendry offered no contest to the charge that the marriage had broken down due to Hendry's "unreasonable behaviour".

Death
Munro died aged 38 on 6 December 1972 on her way to hospital after collapsing at her 
home in Tufnell Park. Her death was ruled due to a heart attack caused by chronic ischaemic heart disease. She was cremated and interred at the Golders Green Crematorium.

Filmography

Awards and nominations

References

External links 
 

1934 births
1972 deaths
English film actresses
English television actresses
People from Blackpool
English people of Scottish descent
Golders Green Crematorium
20th-century English actresses
New Star of the Year (Actress) Golden Globe winners